This is a list of music-related events in 1808.

Events
December 20 – The original Covent Garden Theatre in London is destroyed by a fire, along with most of the scenery, costumes and scripts.
December 22 – Beethoven concert of 22 December 1808: Ludwig van Beethoven conducts and plays piano in a marathon benefit concert at the Theater an der Wien in Vienna consisting entirely of first public performances of works by him including the Symphony No. 5, Symphony No. 6, Piano Concerto No. 4 and Choral Fantasy.
Harvard University forms its own orchestra.
Ignaz Schuppanzigh's Schuppanzigh Quartet enters the employment of Count Andrey Razumovsky.
Ignaz Assmayer becomes organist of St Peter's Abbey, Salzburg.

Popular Music
 "Believe Me, if All Those Endearing Young Charms", part of the Irish Melodies by poet Thomas Moore and composer (Sir) John Andrew Stevenson

Classical Music
Ludwig van Beethoven 
Symphony No. 5, Op. 67 (completed)
Symphony No. 6, Op. 68
Cello Sonata No. 3, Op. 69
Piano Trios Op. 70 (including the "Ghost" Piano Trio)
Fantasia in C minor, Op. 80
2 Marches for Military Band, WoO 18-19
"Andenken", WoO 136
Bernhard Henrik Crusell – Clarinet Concerto no. 2
Johann Nepomuk Hummel – Piano Sonata No.4, Op. 38
Etienne Mehul – Symphony No.1 in G minor
Ferdinand Ries 
Piano Quartet, Op. 13
Cello Sonata, Op. 20
Cello Sonata, Op. 21
Quintet or Septet, Op. 25
Piano Sonata, Op. 26
Violin Sonata No. 19 in D minor, Op. 83
Alessandro Rolla 
Viola Concertino in E-flat major, BI 328
Divertimento for Viola and String Quartet, BI 330
Louis Spohr 
2 Duos for 2 Violins, Op. 9
String Quartet No.4, Op. 15 No.1
Potpourri No.4, Op. 24
Clarinet Concerto No.1, Op. 26
Violin Concerto No.6, Op. 28
Symphonie concertante No.1, Op. 48
Carl Maria von Weber 
7 Variations sur un thème original, Op. 9
Momento capriccioso, Op. 12
6 Lieder, Op. 15
Grand potpourri, Op. 20
Grande polonaise, Op. 21
Silvana, J.87 (opera)

Births
February 14 – Michael Costa, Italian-born conductor and composer (died 1884)
February 28 – Elias Parish Alvars, English-born arranger and harpist (died 1849)
March 24 – Maria Malibran, French-born Spanish soprano (died 1836)
April 10 – Auguste Franchomme, French cellist and composer (died 1884)
May 15 – Michael William Balfe, Irish composer (died 1870)
October 24 – Ernst Richter, German musical theorist (died 1879)
December 26 – Albert Grisar, Belgian composer (died 1869)

Deaths
February 29 – Carlos Baguer, Spanish composer (born 1768)
April 4 – Carlo Gozzi, Venetian lyricist and playwright (born 1720)
May 14 – Robert Broderip, English organist and composer
May 22 – Edmund Ayrton, English organist (born 1734)
July 20 – François-Hippolyte Barthélémon, French violinist (born 1741)
September 29 – Paul Wranitzky, Moravian composer (born 1756)
date unknown – Gaétan Vestris, French ballet dancer (born 1729)

References

 
19th century in music
Music by year